There are 31 Interstate Highways—9 main routes and 22 auxiliary routes—that exist entirely or partially in the U.S. state of New York. In New York, Interstate Highways are mostly maintained by the New York State Department of Transportation (NYSDOT), with some exceptions. Unlike in some other states, Interstate Highways in New York are not directly referenced by NYSDOT with their number; instead, the letter "I" is suffixed to the number of the route on reference markers and in internal documents. On the surface, there appears to be numerical duplication between several Interstate Highways and state routes—such as I-86 (I-86) and NY 86—but the "I" suffix that is appended to Interstate Highway numbers allows the Interstate Highway and state route to co-exist ("86I" versus "86", respectively).

There are a combined  of Interstate Highways within New York, which handles about 19 percent of vehicle travel in New York.

Small portions of I-278 in New York City are maintained by local authorities rather than the state transportation agency. In addition, parts of I-87, I-287, I-90, I-190, and I-95 are part of the New York State Thruway system and thus are maintained by the New York State Thruway Authority.

Main routes

Auxiliary routes

See also

References

External links

 
Interstate Highways